Ponhea Lueu District is a district (srok) of Kandal Province, Cambodia. The district is subdivided into 14 communes (khum) such as Chhveang, Chrey Loas, Kampong Luong, Kampong Os, Kaoh Chen, Phnum Bat, Ponhea Lueu, Ponhea Pon, Preaek Pnov, Preaek Ta Teaen, Phsar Daek, Samraong, Tumnob Thum, Vihear Luong and 141 villages (phum). In the northern part of the district, near the border between Kampong Speu and Kampong Chhnang is the old royal capital of Oudong.

References

External links
Kandal at Royal Government of Cambodia website
Kandal at Ministry of Commerce website

Districts of Kandal province